Diacria is a genus of gastropods belonging to the family Cavoliniidae.

The genus has almost cosmopolitan distribution.

Species:

Diacria digitata 
Diacria erythra 
Diacria gracilis 
Diacria italica 
Diacria maculata 
Diacria major 
Diacria mbaensis 
Diacria microstriata 
Diacria paeninsula 
Diacria philippinensis 
Diacria piccola 
Diacria quadridentata 
Diacria rampalae 
Diacria sangiorgii 
Diacria trispinosa

References

Cavoliniidae